Krape Parish is an administrative unit of Ogre Municipality in the Vidzeme region of Latvia.

Towns, villages and settlements of Krape parish

References 

Parishes of Latvia
Ogre Municipality
Vidzeme